Daniel O. Theno (born May 8, 1947) was an American politician and educator.

Born in Ashland, Wisconsin, Theno graduated with a BS from the University of Wisconsin–Madison in 1969. He spent his senior year teaching at the University of Rio Grade do Sol in Porto Alegre, Brazil, under a university fellowship. He taught agriculture. Theno won a special election to the Wisconsin State Senate in 1972 from the 25th District of northern Wisconsin, defeating Ernest J. Korpela. He was re-elected in 1974, 1978, and 1982. In April 1986, Theno was elected mayor of Ashland, Wisconsin.

References

Mayors of places in Wisconsin
Republican Party Wisconsin state senators
University of Wisconsin–Madison alumni
People from Ashland, Wisconsin
Educators from Wisconsin
1947 births
Living people